Nico Cristian Mirallegro (born 26 January 1991) is an English actor. He is best known for his roles as Barry "Newt" Newton in the soap opera Hollyoaks (2007–2010), Finn Nelson in My Mad Fat Diary (2013–2015), Joe Middleton in The Village (2013), and Johnjo O'Shea in Common (2014). His feature film credits include Spike Island (2012), Anita B. (2014), The Pass (2016), and Peterloo (2018).

Recognised in 2012 by Screen International as one of its "Stars of Tomorrow", he has been lauded as one of the United Kingdom's "most promising young actors". Among his award nominations are those for Best Actor at the BBC Audio Drama Awards (2016, for Orpheus and Eurydice) and Best Supporting Actor at the BAFTA Awards (2014, for The Village).

Early life
Nico Cristian Mirallegro was born on 26 January 1991 in Heywood, Greater Manchester. His Italian father is from Sicily and his Irish mother, Maureen McLaughlin, is from Malin Head. He briefly attended a boarding school outside the UK, at which he was lonely and felt out of place. He also attended Siddal Moor Sports College in Heywood and the Manchester School of Acting. His parents are separated and his father lives in Spain, with Mirallegro having moved there as a teenager to live with him for a time. He is conversational in Italian and Spanish.

Mirallegro says that he "fell into" acting in his mid-teens after following his sister Claudia to improv classes. At one of his first acting classes, he was "so scared [he] had to get one of the other lads to say [his] lines".

Career

Television
Mirallegro's first professional acting role came in 2007, after he was cast as emo teenager Newt in the long-running British soap opera Hollyoaks. Although he voluntarily left Hollyoaks after two years at age 18 to follow other acting projects, he was grateful for the opportunity to appear on the show: "Hollyoaks is where I learnt a lot of the craft, being in front of a camera six days a week. That's certainly an experience you don't get in drama school."

When filming for Hollyoaks, Mirallegro was also playing Cam Spencer in LOL, a web series which explored sex, drugs, and relationships. In 2010, Mirallegro appeared in an episode of the BBC drama series Moving On as a gay youngster who suffers bullying in school because of his sexuality. Beginning 2010, he appeared as an Italian foreign exchange student in nine episodes of the regular BBC series Doctors.

In December 2010, Mirallegro was in series one of the BBC One 1930s-period remake of Upstairs Downstairs. He portrayed a young footman called Johnny Proude, who took up a position in service to escape the poverty of the northern mining town where he was born. The BBC re-commissioned the production for a second series, in which he appeared again as Johnny. In the second series, his character appeared in a boxing tournament, requiring Mirallegro to take boxing lessons for the role. In 2011, Mirallegro appeared in the BBC's three-part psychological thriller Exile, playing the teenage version of leading character Tom Ronstadt. Later that year, he played Sam, a gay heroin addict in the BBC drama The Body Farm.

In 2013, he began playing Finn Nelson, the love interest of the main female character in E4's teen comedy-drama series My Mad Fat Diary. That same year, he also played the role of Joe Middleton in the BBC drama The Village. In 2014, Mirallegro portrayed a teenager prosecuted for murder under the Joint Enterprise law in the controversial BBC One production Common, written by Jimmy McGovern. Called "a bleak, powerful drama thick with political intent", a review started that Mirallegro "continues to prove himself as the best actor ever to graduate from Hollyoaks".

The 2015 television film The Ark told the story of Noah, along with elements from Islamic tradition. Mirallegro portrayed Kenan, Noah's youngest (and extrabiblical) son, whose wish to follow a path different from his father and brothers results in his being swept away in the Great Flood. Mirallegro also starred in HBO's Virtuoso, directed and partially written by Alan Ball. Set in the 18th century, Mirallegro played a self-taught violin prodigy who travels to Vienna to learn with other young musicians.

In June 2017, Mirallegro acted in the BBC's BAFTA winning real-life drama Murdered for Being Different, about the murder of Sophie Lancaster in 2007. In 2019, it was confirmed he would be cast as an army soldier in the new series of the long-running BBC One drama Our Girl.

Film
Mirallegro's first film, the short film Six Minutes of Freedom, was shot in 2009. He starred as a troubled teenager training to be a boxer while his father is in prison. The film was entered into four film festivals, and it won Best New Wave Short Film at the Yellow Fever Independent Film Festival.

In the summer of 2010, Mirallegro finished filming for his role in McQueen the Movie. He played Sam, a Jewish boy who is one of the story's two protagonists. The film is set in suburbia in the North of England in the 1990s.

Mirallegro portrayed a teenage lead guitarist in a full-length film set in the 1990s about the Manchester-formed rock band The Stone Roses.  The film, Spike Island, was released in 2012. He called his time making Spike Island "six weeks of pure bliss."

Shooting for Socrates is a 2014 football drama telling "the underdog story of a Northern Ireland team who kick off their world cup against football giants Brazil. The game is a baptism of fire for [Mirallegro's] character, David Campbell, who makes his Northern Ireland debut in front of 50,000 people the day before his 21st birthday". The film's cast was recognized as talented, but reviews of the script were less positive.

Stage
In January 2014, Mirallegro appeared at London's Royal Court Theatre in the drama The Pass, in which Russell Tovey plays a football player coming to terms with his homosexuality. Mirallegro reprised his comic role as a hotel bellboy in an "irrepressible performance" in a 2016 film adaptation of the work, which premiered at the BFI Flare: London LGBT Film Festival.

Radio
Since 2014, Mirallegro has performed in several BBC Radio 4 dramas, including as the eponymous male character in Orpheus and Eurydice. For this role he was nominated Best Actor at the BBC Audio Drama Awards in 2016. He was later cast as the protagonist in 79 Birthdays (2016) and as the son in Over Here, Over There (2016). The latter is a radio drama inspired by the plight of asylum seekers in the UK.

Charity work
Mirallegro plays in celebrity football matches for charities such as Help For Heroes and Once Upon a Smile.

Personal life
Mirallegro is a supporter of Manchester United FC.

Filmography

Film

Television

Stage

Music videos

Radio

Web series

Audio books

Awards and nominations

Notes

References

External links
 Nico Mirallegro at Curtis Brown Literary and Talent Agency

 
 
 Works by or about Nico Mirallegro in libraries (WorldCat catalog)

Living people
1991 births
21st-century English male actors
English male film actors
English male radio actors
English male soap opera actors
English people of Irish descent
English people of Sicilian descent
English male child actors
English male stage actors
English male voice actors
Male actors from Manchester
English male television actors